This article discusses the year 2004 in Hungary.

Incumbents
President – Ferenc Mádl
Prime Minister – Péter Medgyessy (until 29 September), Ferenc Gyurcsány (starting 29 September)
Speaker – Katalin Szili

Events

May 
May 1 - Hungary joins European Union.

June 
June 13 - 2004 European Parliament election in Hungary Fidesz Wins.

December 
December 5 - 2004 Hungarian dual citizenship referendum Both measures were approved by voters.

Births

Deaths

January

 25 January – Miklós Fehér, 24, Hungarian football player, cardiac arrest.

February

 2 February – Róbert Zimonyi, 85, Hungarian Olympic rower.
 12 February – Julius Elischer, 85, Hungarian-born Australian architect.

March

 8 March – János Bognár, 89, Hungarian Olympic cyclist.

April

 13 April – Csaba Horváth, 74, Hungarian-born American chemical engineer and scientist.

See also
 Hungary at the 2004 Summer Olympics
 List of Hungarian films since 1990

References

 
Years of the 21st century in Hungary
2000s in Hungary
Hungary
Hungary